Quarles Range is a high and rugged range of the Queen Maud Mountains, extending from the polar plateau between Cooper and Bowman Glaciers and terminating near the edge of Ross Ice Shelf. Peaks in the range were first sighted by Captain Roald Amundsen in 1911, and the range was mapped in detail by the Byrd Antarctic Expedition, 1928–30. It was named by the Advisory Committee on Antarctic Names (US-ACAN) for Donald A. Quarles, Sec. of the Air Force, 1955–57, and Deputy Sec. of Defense, 1957–59, at the outset of the International Geophysical Year and organization of U.S. activity in Antarctica.

Key mountains
Mount Harrington is a mountain, 2,550 m, standing 4 nautical miles (7 km) northeast of Mount Ruth Gade in the Quarles Range. It was mapped by the Byrd Antarctic Expedition, 1928–30, and by the United States Geological Survey (USGS) from surveys and U.S. Navy air photos, 1960–64.  It was named by Advisory Committee on Antarctic Names (US-ACAN) for John R. Harrington, meteorologist with the South Pole Station winter party, 1962.

Features
Geographical features include:

 Bowman Glacier
 Cooper Glacier
 Mohn Basin
 Mount Belecz
 Mount Dean
 Mount Ruth Gade
 Mount Wedel-Jarlsberg
 Schobert Nunatak

References 

Queen Maud Mountains
Amundsen Coast